Myrtus communis, the common myrtle or true myrtle, is a species of flowering plant in the myrtle family Myrtaceae. It is an evergreen shrub native to southern Europe, North Africa, Western Asia, Macaronesia, and the Indian Subcontinent, and also cultivated. It is also sometimes known as Corsican pepper.

The medicinal properties of Myrtus communis were utilized as early as 600 B.C.E. Symbolically and ritually important in ancient times, it was used to represent honor, justice, prosperity, generosity, hope, love, and happiness. In Greco-Roman mythology, numerous gods were associated with the common myrtle and its flowers, such as Aphrodite and Demeter. Also a key part of various Jewish traditions, it is one of the four species used in the festival of Sukkot, and the Bible records its use in purification ceremonies. As a shrub that thrives along waterways, it was also seen as a symbol of restoration and recovery.

In Europe during the Renaissance, it came to be best known as a symbol of love, which led to the ongoing tradition of the flower as part of the wedding bouquet.

For uses and further historical significance, see Myrtus.

Description

The flowers are white or tinged with pink, with five petals and many stamens that protrude from the flower. The fruit is an edible berry, blue-black when ripe.

The essential oils derived from this plant have anti-proliferative and anti-quorum sensing properties, helping against food spoilage. Myrtus communis berries are also macerated in alcohol to make Mirto liqueur.

This species and the more compact M. communis subsp. tarentina 
have won the Royal Horticultural Society's Award of Garden Merit. They are hardy but prefer a sheltered position in full sun.

See Also
Austromyrtus dulcis (Midgen berry)
Ugni molinae (Chilean guava berry)

References

Plants described in 1753
communis
Flora of Macaronesia
Flora of the Indian subcontinent
Flora of Western Asia
Flora of Iran
Taxa named by Carl Linnaeus
Flora of Malta
Flora of the Mediterranean Basin
Flora of Greece